Eric Barriere (born December 27, 1997) is an American football quarterback for the Michigan Panthers of the United States Football League (USFL). He played college football for Eastern Washington University. Barriere won the Walter Payton Award for the 2021 FCS season, an award given to the top offensive player in the NCAA Division I Football Championship Subdivision.

Early life and high school
Barriere grew up in Inglewood, California and attended La Habra High School in La Habra, California. He finished his high school career with 7,586 passing yards and 104 touchdowns and also rushed for 1,718 yards and 26 touchdowns.

College career
Barriere redshirted his true freshman season. He became the Eagles starting quarterback six games into his redshirt sophomore season and led the team to an 8–2 record while passing for 2,450 yards and 24 touchdowns and also rushing for 606 yards and eight touchdowns. In his first full season as a starter, Barriere completed 258 of 438 pass attempts for 3,712 yards and 31 touchdowns against four interceptions while also rushing for 558 yards and eight touchdowns. As a redshirt junior, he completed 183 of 296 passes for 2,439 yards, 19 touchdowns and seven interceptions in seven games during spring 2021 season, which was delayed from the fall due to the COVID-19 pandemic. Barriere was a finalist for the Walter Payton Award and finished second in voting behind winner Cole Kelley. As a redshirt senior, Barriere won the Walter Payton award after passing for 5,070 yards and 46 touchdowns.

Professional career
Barriere went unselected in the 2022 NFL Draft. He was participated in a rookie minicamp with the Denver Broncos on a tryout basis, but was not offered a contract.

On May 20, 2022, Barriere signed with the Michigan Panthers of the United States Football League (USFL) and was subsequently transferred to the team's inactive roster. On June 10, 2022, Barriere was transferred to the active roster.

Career Statistics

References

External links 
 Eastern Washington Eagles profile

1997 births
Living people
Players of American football from Inglewood, California
American football quarterbacks
Eastern Washington Eagles football players
Walter Payton Award winners
Michigan Panthers (2022) players